National Highway 108 (NH 108) connects  Dharasu and Gangotri Dham in Uttarakhand.

Route 
 Uttarkashi
 Yamunotri

See also
 List of National Highways in India (by Highway Number)
 List of National Highways in India
 National Highways Development Project

References

External links
  NH network map of India

108
National highways in India (old numbering)